Ivan Komarov (19 June 1921 – 11 April 2005) was a Soviet fencer. He competed in the team foil event at the 1952 Summer Olympics.

References

External links
 

1921 births
2005 deaths
Soviet male fencers
Olympic fencers of the Soviet Union
Fencers at the 1952 Summer Olympics